The Siuslaw River Bridge is a bascule bridge that spans the Siuslaw River on U.S. Route 101 in Florence, Oregon. It was designed by Conde McCullough, built by the Mercer-Fraser Company of Eureka, California, and funded by the Federal Emergency Administration of Public Works (later renamed the Public Works Administration). It opened in 1936.

When open, the  double-leaf bascule provides  of horizontal clearance for boat traffic. The bascule section is flanked by two  reinforced concrete tied arches, identical to those used in the original Alsea Bay Bridge. Four Art Deco-style obelisks house mechanical equipment as well as living quarters for the bridge operator. The total cost of the bridge was $527,000 (equivalent to $ million in ).

The bridge was added to the National Register of Historic Places on August 5, 2005.

See also

List of bridges documented by the Historic American Engineering Record in Oregon
List of bridges on the National Register of Historic Places in Oregon
List of bridges on U.S. Route 101 in Oregon

References

External links

Bridges completed in 1936
Bascule bridges in the United States
Road bridges on the National Register of Historic Places in Oregon
Public Works Administration in Oregon
U.S. Route 101
National Register of Historic Places in Lane County, Oregon
Bridges in Lane County, Oregon
Tied arch bridges in the United States
Art Deco architecture in Oregon
Historic American Engineering Record in Oregon
Bridges by Conde McCullough
Bridges of the United States Numbered Highway System
1936 establishments in Oregon
Drawbridges on the National Register of Historic Places
Concrete bridges in the United States